Yu Huili (born October 5, 1982 in Sichuan) is a female Chinese softball player. She was part of the 4th-placed team at the 2006 World Championship.

She will compete for Team China at the 2008 Summer Olympics in Beijing.

References
Profile

1982 births
Living people
Chinese softball players
Olympic softball players of China
Sportspeople from Sichuan
Softball players at the 2004 Summer Olympics
Softball players at the 2008 Summer Olympics
Asian Games medalists in softball
Softball players at the 2006 Asian Games
Medalists at the 2006 Asian Games
Asian Games bronze medalists for China